SS Caddo may refer to one of two Type T2 tankers built for the United States Maritime Commission for the Socony-Vacuum Oil Company:

  (MC hull number 143, Type T2), built by Bethlehem Sparrows Point Shipyard; acquired by the United States Navy and converted to  USS Merrimack (AO-37); placed in National Defense Reserve Fleet in 1959; scrapped in 1982

Ship names